San Juan is a corregimiento in San Lorenzo District, Chiriquí Province, Panama. Its population as of 1990 was 2,358; its population as of 2000 was 1,559.

References

Corregimientos of Chiriquí Province